Josie Lawrence (born Wendy Lawrence; 6 June 1959) is an English actress and comedian. She is best known for her work with the Comedy Store Players improvisational troupe, the television series Whose Line Is It Anyway? and as Manda Best in EastEnders.

Early life
Lawrence was born Wendy Lawrence on 6 June 1959 in Old Hill, Staffordshire. Her parents were Bert Lawrence and Kathleen Lawrence, née Griffin, who were married in 1948. She has twin siblings, John and Janet, who are ten years her senior (1949). They were brought up in nearby Cradley Heath, where their father worked for British Leyland and their mother as a dinner lady. Lawrence wanted to be an actress at the early age of 5 and at 16 joined the Barlow Players in Oldbury.

She studied at Dartington College of Arts from 1978 to 1981, receiving a Bachelor of Arts honours degree.

Career

Stage
Her first acting role was as a young boy in a production of The Ragged Trousered Philanthropists at the Half Moon Theatre (in 2016 she became a patron of the theatre). During the 1980s, she was also involved in a play called Passionaria at the Newcastle Playhouse, starring Denise Black and Kate McKenzie, and they later formed the jazz group Denise Black and the Kray Sisters.

Her work in comedy began as a result of starring in a Donmar Warehouse play called Songs For Stray Cats and hearing the audience invited to supply lines and ideas for improvisers appearing in after-show cabaret.

She starred as the title character in the 1993 Lyric Theatre, Hammersmith production of the musical Moll Flanders.

From 1994–96, Lawrence played Katharine in the Royal Shakespeare Company production of The Taming of the Shrew in both Stratford-upon-Avon and London, for which she received a Dame Peggy Ashcroft award for Best Actress. She also appeared in Faust and The Cherry Orchard and starred as Benedick in an all-female production of Much Ado About Nothing at Shakespeare's Globe, having played Beatrice previously at Manchester's Royal Exchange. She made her West End theatre debut in 2001 taking over the lead role of Anna in the stage musical The King and I, replacing Elaine Paige. In 2005, she appeared with Victoria Wood, Julie Walters and Celia Imrie in the cult West End production of Wood's Acorn Antiques: The Musical.

In 2008, Lawrence took the lead role in Tom Stoppard's Hapgood at the Birmingham Repertory Theatre and later at the West Yorkshire Playhouse in which she was a secret spymaster given the task of exposing a traitor who is leaking vital information to the Russians. In the same year, she co-directed The Time Step, a comedy about fantasies and talent contests, with Linda Marlowe at the Edinburgh Festival.

Lawrence appeared as Madame Ranevskaya in a new version of Chekhov's The Cherry Orchard, translated by Tom Stoppard, at the Birmingham Repertory Theatre in autumn 2010.

Film and television
Lawrence came to public attention as a regular guest on the Channel 4 improvisational comedy series Whose Line Is It Anyway? at its launch in 1988. Lawrence's speciality on the show was her ability to improvise songs on the spot. She was the first female improvisational comedian to perform regularly on the show. Lawrence was featured on Whose Line until its 9th series in 1997-1998, which was the last of the UK series made in London. She also performed in two episodes of the American edition of the show in 1999.

In 1991, she had her own short-lived comedy series Josie, also on Channel 4. The next year she starred in Enchanted April a British remake of the 1935 film based on Elizabeth von Arnim's novel. Her other television work includes the comedy series Not with a Bang and Downwardly Mobile, and she is remembered for her performances as Maggie Costello in the cricketing comedy drama Outside Edge alongside Timothy Spall and Brenda Blethyn, for which she was awarded the Spectacle Wearer of the Year award in 1993. She went on to perform in Sealed with a Loving Kiss and Lunch in the Park as part of the Paul Merton in Galton and Simpson's... series on 16 February 1996 and 21 October 1997. She appeared in the 1999 made-for-television film The Flint Street Nativity as both Debbie Bennett and Debbie's mother. In 2000, she played Camilla in A Many Splintered Thing. Between 1999 and 2001, she was the voice of "Duck" in the children's television show Dog and Duck.

In 2006, she starred alongside Peter Davison in The Complete Guide to Parenting as Phoebe Huntley. She has also appeared in the BBC 1 drama series Robin Hood and as Mrs Jiniwin in the 2007 ITV adaptation of The Old Curiosity Shop. She appeared in an episode of the 2007 E4 teen comedy/drama Skins, playing Liz Jenkins, estranged mother of Sid Jenkins, a role which she reprised in the second series.

Lawrence was in EastEnders from March 2009 to February 2010. She played Amanda Best, an old flame of Minty Peterson. She was featured with Meera Syal in a celebrity special of Who Wants to be a Millionaire? that aired on 31 January 2009. She has appeared as a guest on the panel show games QI and Never Mind the Buzzcocks.

In 2010, Lawrence appeared in series 25, episode 3 of Casualty named "The Chaos Theory". Lawrence played Mrs Janet Haines, head teacher of a school where sixteen children were admitted to the emergency department having taken LSD. Also in 2010, she played the part of Sandra, Tony's agent, in the 2010 British feature film version of Tony Hawks' best selling book Round Ireland with a Fridge that was released in September 2010 and was released on DVD in November 2010.

In 2012, she appeared in Doctors alongside Louise Jameson who has also appeared in EastEnders. Lawrence played Cathy Dayman, and Jameson played Shirley Carter. Also in 2012, she appeared on one episode of the US improv series, Trust Us With Your Life, similar to Whose Line is it Anyway?, but never made it to air.

Lawrence provided the voice of "The Brain" in the 2015 BBC Two quiz show Beat The Brain.

In 2016, she played Barbara, a synthetic marriage counsellor in series 2 of the Channel 4 television series Humans.

In 2018, she played the lover of a married man portrayed by former "Whose Line" castmate John Sessions in the feature film Finding Your Feet.

In 2019, she played Agnes Nutter is the Amazon Prime series Good Omens.

In 2020, she appeared in the BBC television series Shakespeare & Hathaway: Private Investigators episode 3.5 "Thy Fury Spent" as Dr Helen Middleton.

Radio
Lawrence starred in three series of the improvised comedy series The Masterson Inheritance from 1993 to 1995 on BBC Radio 4 alongside Paul Merton, Phelim McDermott, Caroline Quentin, Lee Simpson and Jim Sweeney. Each episode comprised a different time period, and the plots were improvised based on suggestions from the studio audience. One unaired episode was produced and narrated by Lawrence, but it was released on the internet by Jim Sweeney on his official site.

The BBC Radio 4 series The Lawrence Sweeney Mix aired from 27 February to 20 March 2007 and was described as "Josie Lawrence and Jim Sweeney create improvised sketches from audience suggestions". Series 2 began airing on 29 January 2008.

She has starred in three other BBC Radio 4 comedy series:  the science fiction comedy Married in 1996 and the dark comedy series Vent in 2006 as well as appearing in a Galton and Simpson Radio Playhouse 50th Anniversary recording of Clicquot et Fils alongside Richard Griffiths and Roger Lloyd-Pack that originally aired on 29 December 1998.

She played the role of 'Amanda' in the comedy series Reluctant Persuaders on BBC Radio 4.

Lawrence made her debut appearance in the long-running BBC Radio 4 show Just a Minute on 7 January 2008 and returned again in the following series.

In December 2014, Lawrence played the role of Agnes Nutter in an adaptation of Terry Pratchett and Neil Gaiman's book Good Omens for BBC Radio 4.  In 2019, she reprised the role for the Amazon/BBC television production of the book.

Audio books
Lawrence has lent her voice to several audiobooks, the majority of which were books for children. She has recorded several of the books in Roger Hargreaves' Little Miss series, namely, Bossy, Giggles, Trouble, Tiny, Sunshine, Naughty, Somersault and Neat and four of Jacqueline Wilson's books, Secrets, The Illustrated Mum, Bad Girls and The Bed and Breakfast Star. She has also recorded books from Emma Thomson's Felicity Wishes, Eric Hill's Spot the Dog and Tony Bradman's Dilly the Dinosaur, as well as Philip Ridley's Mercedes Ice and Julia Donaldson and Axel Scheffler's Room on the Broom as well as the 2005 Muffin The Mule story books for a grand CD release.
For adults, Lawrence has recorded audiocassettes of Rosie Thomas's Sun at Midnight, Lynne Truss's Going Loco and Daphne du Maurier's Jamaica Inn.

Video games
She appeared on the 1992-1993 series of GamesMaster, playing Mad Dog McCree winning her challenge.

Charity
In 2003, Lawrence spent eight months walking across China, Cuba, Peru and Tanzania for Breakthrough Breast Cancer and helped to raise over £550,000. She had to wear a knee brace throughout the trek because of damage to her anterior cruciate ligament.

In 2005, she climbed Mount Kilimanjaro for Sunfield, a school for children with autism and complex learning needs, of which she is a patron. On 21 April 2008, she hosted a VIP-night performance of Hapgood at The Birmingham Rep in aid of Sunfield and raised a further £3,500 for the charity. In 2009, Lawrence raised £25,000 for Sunfield by appearing on Who Wants to Be a Millionaire? with Meera Syal.

Lawrence and Shane Richie participated in the final leg of the celebrity Around the World in 80 Days challenge to raise money for Children in Need 2009. They travelled from Memphis to Wilmington, North Carolina and then to London over 15 days.

Honours and personal life
Lawrence is single. In an interview with Jim Sweeney, she said of being asked why she is unmarried, "It's always the same: 'You're 41 and not married and no kids.' God, I'm so bored with it." She resides in Hackney, London. She has two cats, a long-haired ginger (Aynuk) and a black-and-white (Ayli), named after the Black Country characters Aynuk and Ayli, who feature prominently in jokes about Black Country dialect. As a guest on QI she named David Attenborough "her God".

In 1994, Lawrence was awarded an honorary doctorate by Dartington College of Arts, and she has since been awarded two more, an honorary doctorate of letters from the University of Wolverhampton in 2004 and in 2006 a doctorate by Aston University for "services to the entertainment industry."

Sandwell Council named one of their road gritting trucks "Frozie Lawrence" in her honour.

Filmography

Appearances

References

External links

Josie Lawrence on Stages of Half Moon

1959 births
Living people
20th-century English actresses
21st-century English actresses
Audiobook narrators 
English film actresses
English stage actresses
English television actresses
English voice actresses
English women comedians
People from Oldbury, West Midlands
Royal Shakespeare Company members